Robert N. McDonald (born February 23, 1952) is a former judge of the Maryland Court of Appeals. He was appointed to the Court by Governor Martin O'Malley in 2012.

Personal life and education
Judge McDonald is originally from Queens, New York.  Judge McDonald graduated from the prestigious Regis High School in 1970, earned a Bachelor of Arts in economics from Harvard University, summa cum laude, in 1974, and earned his Juris Doctor from Harvard Law School, magna cum laude, in 1977.  At Harvard Law School, Judge McDonald served on the editorial board of the Harvard Law Review from 1975 to 1977. He is a nephew of former U.S. House of Representatives member John N. Erlenborn.

Career
Prior to his appointment to the bench, Judge McDonald had a distinguished career in public service, serving in the United States Attorneys Office and later in the Office of the Attorney General of Maryland.

References

External links 
 Homepage for the Court of Appeals
 Information from the Maryland Archives
 Maryland Constitution, Article IV: Judiciary Department
 Red Robes and the Maryland Court of Appeals
 Judicial Records from The Archives of Maryland

1952 births
Living people
21st-century American judges
Assistant United States Attorneys
Harvard Law School alumni
Judges of the Maryland Court of Appeals
People from Queens, New York
Harvard College alumni